Wild Horse Round-Up is a 1936 American drama film directed by Alan James from a screenplay by Joseph O'Donnell, based on a short story by James Oliver Curwood.  The film stars Kermit Maynard, Betty Lloyd, and Dickie Jones.

Cast
Kermit Maynard as Jack Benson
Betty Lloyd as Ruth Williams
Dickie Jones as Dickie Williams
John Merton as Charlie Doan
Frank Hagney as Steve
Roger Williams as Pete
Dick Curtis as Bill
Budd Buster as Mopey

References

1936 drama films
Films directed by Alan James
Films based on works by James Oliver Curwood